There are nine national parks in Slovakia:

See also
Protected areas of Slovakia

External links 
Slovak National Parks at Slovakia.travel
Slovak National Parks at Slovakiatourism.sk
A semi-official description of the Slovak National Parks at travelguide.sk

Slovakia
 
National parks
National parks